Standards for Interstate Highways in the United States are defined by the American Association of State Highway and Transportation Officials (AASHTO) in the publication A Policy on Design Standards: Interstate System. For a certain highway to be considered an Interstate Highway, it must meet these construction requirements or obtain a waiver from the Federal Highway Administration.

Standards 
Standardization helps keep road design consistent, such that drivers can learn the consistent features and drive accordingly. Standardization can therefore decrease accidents and increase driver safety.

These standards are, :
 Controlled access: All access onto and off the highway is to be controlled with interchanges and grade separations, including all railroad crossings. Interchanges are to provide access to and from both directions of the highway and both directions of the crossroad.
 In urban areas, there should be no driveways or other access points to adjacent properties along the crossroad for at least  from entrance and exit ramps, in both directions, and for at least  in rural areas.
In urban and suburban areas, consideration should be given to accommodating bicycles and pedestrians along crossroads.
 The sight distance, curvature and superelevation of the highway should follow the current edition of AASHTO's A Policy on Geometric Design of Highways and Streets for the chosen design speed.
 Maximum grade: The maximum permissible vertical angle, or grade, along the highway is determined from terrain and design speed, with up to 6% generally allowed in mountainous areas, 5% in rolling terrain, and 4% on level terrain. An additional 1% is allowed in urban areas.
 Minimum number of lanes: There are to be at least two lanes in each direction, unless more are necessary for an acceptable level of service, according to the current edition of AASHTO's A Policy on Geometric Design of Highways and Streets. Climbing lanes and emergency escape ramps should be provided where appropriate.
In places with higher truck traffic, over 250 Directional Design Hour Volume, wider shoulders should be considered.
 Pavement sloping: On straight sections of the highway, the roadway is to have a cross slope of at least 1.5%, and preferably 2% to ensure proper drainage, with up to 2.5% in areas of heavy rainfall. The cross slope of both the left and right shoulders should be between 2% and 6%, but not less than the main lanes.
 Recovery areas: There should be no fixed objects in the clear zone, the width of which should be determined by the design speed in accordance with the current edition of AASHTO's Roadside Design Guide. When this is not possible, breakaway supports or barriers guarding the objects should be used. Special care should be taken in depressed highways, where piers and walls should be placed at least  beyond the outer edge of either shoulder. Slopes in the clear zone should be at most 1:4, and should typically be 1:6. 
 Curbs: No curb is to be placed nearer to the roadway than the outside edge of the paved shoulder. Special care should be taken when curbs are combined with barriers.
Existing bridges can remain part of the Interstate system if they have at least  lanes with  shoulder on the left and a  shoulder on the right, except that longer bridges can have  shoulders on both sides. For all bridges, the railing should be upgraded if necessary.
In addition, access for emergency responders needs to be accommodated. The minimum vertical clearance is the same as it is under bridges.

Exceptions

The standards have been changed over the years, resulting in many older Interstates not conforming to the current standards, and yet others are not built to standards because to do so would be too costly or environmentally unsound.

Some roads were grandfathered into the system. Most of these were toll roads that were built before the Interstate system came into existence or were under construction at the time President Dwight D. Eisenhower signed the Federal Aid Highway Act of 1956. One example is the Pennsylvania Turnpike, which originally had a very narrow median that later required the installation of a Jersey barrier due to heavy traffic loads.

Interstate 35E through Saint Paul, Minnesota is an example of a freeway that was not grandfathered into the system that is nonetheless an exception to standards. This is due to political opposition from surrounding homeowners in local neighborhoods, which greatly delayed and modified the project.

Interstate 75 on the Mackinac Bridge between St. Ignace and Mackinaw City, Michigan, is undivided. The bridge was designed before the start of the Interstate Highway System, and it was grandfathered into the system.

All the unsigned Interstates in Alaska and Puerto Rico are exempt from Interstate Highway standards and are instead, per Title 23, Chapter 1, Section 103 of the U.S. Code, "designed in accordance with such geometric and construction standards as are adequate for current and probable future traffic demands and the needs of the locality of the highway".

References

 "Interstate standards", John Lansford, employee North Carolina Department of Transportation, misc.transport.road newsgroup November 2, 1999

External links
 Public Safety Standards, United States (Federal Government) – Offers free downloads of documents, including AASHTO's "A Policy on Design Standards", that have been incorporated by reference into the US Code of Federal Regulations and can therefore be freely copied as edicts of government.
 AASHTO Bookstore – A Policy on Design Standards – Interstate System

Standards
Standards of the United States
Construction standards